Christopher Owen George (30 September 1891 – 8 September 1977) was Archdeacon of Suffolk from  1947 to 1961.

George was educated at Ipswich School and Selwyn College, Cambridge; and ordained Deacon in 1914 and Priest in 1915. After a curacy in  Great Yarmouth he was Associate Secretary of Dr Barnardo's Homes from 1919 to 1923.

References

1891 births
1977 deaths
Alumni of Selwyn College, Cambridge
Alumni of Ripon College Cuddesdon
People educated at Ipswich School
Archdeacons of Suffolk